William Tilton (October 27, 1834 – March 8, 1910) was an American soldier who fought in the American Civil War. Tilton received his country's highest award for bravery during combat, the Medal of Honor. Tilton's medal was won for his 'gallant conduct in the field' during the Richmond campaign during 1864. He was honored with the award on February 20, 1884.

Tilton was born in St. Albans, Vermont, and entered service in Hanover. He was buried in Enfield, New Hampshire.

Medal of Honor citation

See also
List of American Civil War Medal of Honor recipients: T–Z

References

1834 births
1910 deaths
American Civil War recipients of the Medal of Honor
People from St. Albans, Vermont
People of New Hampshire in the American Civil War
People of Vermont in the American Civil War
Union Army officers
United States Army Medal of Honor recipients